Anjali Mendes (January 29, 1946 – June 17, 2010), born Phyllis Mendes, was an Indian fashion model from Mumbai who was based in France.
 She was attached to Pierre Cardin’s salon in Paris during the 1970s and 1980s. Other designers she modelled for included Emanuel Ungaro, Elsa Schiaparelli and Givenchy. After retirement, she managed Cardin’s Indian operations for 18 years. She died on June 17, 2010 after suddenly falling ill at her home in Provence.

References

1946 births
2010 deaths
Indian female models
Indian emigrants to France
French people of Goan descent
French people of Indian descent
People from Provence
Female models of Indian descent